Miagrammopes is a genus of cribellate orb weavers first described by Octavius Pickard-Cambridge in 1870. These spiders have a unique shape and only four of their original eight eyes. They spin a single line of web, actively watching and jerking the line to catch their prey.

Species
 it contains 71 species:

M. albocinctus Simon, 1893 — Venezuela
M. alboguttatus F. O. Pickard-Cambridge, 1902 — Guatemala to Panama
M. albomaculatus Thorell, 1891 — India (Nicobar Is.)
M. animotus Chickering, 1968 — Puerto Rico
M. apostrophus Sen, Saha & Raychaudhuri, 2013 — India
M. aspinatus Chickering, 1968 — Panama
M. auriculatus Cai & Xu, 2021 — China
M. auriventer Schenkel, 1953 — Venezuela
M. bambusicola Simon, 1893 — Venezuela
M. bifurcatus Dong, Yan, Zhu & Song, 2004 — China
M. birabeni Mello-Leitão, 1945 — Argentina
M. biroi Kulczyński, 1908 — New Guinea
M. bradleyi O. Pickard-Cambridge, 1874 — Australia (New South Wales)
M. brasiliensis Roewer, 1951 — Brazil
M. brevicaudus O. Pickard-Cambridge, 1882 — South Africa
M. brevior Kulczyński, 1908 — New Guinea
M. brooksptensis Barrion & Litsinger, 1995 — Philippines
M. cambridgei Thorell, 1887 — Myanmar, Indonesia (Sumatra)
M. caudatus Keyserling, 1890 — Australia (Queensland)
M. ciliatus Petrunkevitch, 1926 — Puerto Rico, St. Vincent
M. constrictus Purcell, 1904 — South Africa
M. corticeus Simon, 1893 — Venezuela
M. cubanus Banks, 1909 — Cuba
M. extensus Simon, 1889 — India
M. fasciatus Rainbow, 1916 — Australia (Queensland)
M. ferdinandi O. Pickard-Cambridge, 1870 — Sri Lanka
M. flavus (Wunderlich, 1976) — Australia (Queensland)
M. gravelyi Tikader, 1971 — India
M. grodnitskyi Logunov, 2018 — Vietnam
M. gulliveri Butler, 1876 — Mauritius (Rodriguez)
M. guttatus Mello-Leitão, 1937 — Brazil, Argentina
M. indicus Tikader, 1971 — India
M. intempus Chickering, 1968 — Panama
M. kinabalu Logunov, 2018 — Malaysia (Borneo)
M. kirkeensis Tikader, 1971 — India
M. larundus Chickering, 1968 — Panama
M. latens Bryant, 1936 — Cuba, Hispaniola
M. lehtineni (Wunderlich, 1976) — Australia (Queensland)
M. licinus Chickering, 1968 — Panama
M. longicaudus O. Pickard-Cambridge, 1882 — South Africa
M. luederwaldti Mello-Leitão, 1925 — Brazil
M. maigsieus Barrion & Litsinger, 1995 — Philippines
M. mexicanus O. Pickard-Cambridge, 1893 — USA, Mexico
M. molitus Chickering, 1968 — Jamaica
M. oblongus Yoshida, 1982 — Taiwan, Japan
M. oblucus Chickering, 1968 — Jamaica
M. orientalis Bösenberg & Strand, 1906 — China, Korea, Taiwan, Japan
M. paraorientalis Dong, Zhu & Yoshida, 2005 — China
M. pinopus Chickering, 1968 — Virgin Is.
M. plumipes Kulczyński, 1911 — New Guinea
M. poonaensis Tikader, 1971 — India
M. raffrayi Simon, 1881 — Tanzania (Zanzibar), South Africa
M. rimosus Simon, 1886 — Thailand, Vietnam
M. romitii Caporiacco, 1947 — Guyana
M. rubripes Mello-Leitão, 1949 — Brazil
M. rutundus Liang & Xu, 2021 — China
M. satpudaensis Rajoria, 2015 — India
M. scoparius Simon, 1892 — St. Vincent
M. sexpunctatus Simon, 1906 — India
M. similis Kulczyński, 1908 — New Guinea
M. simus Chamberlin & Ivie, 1936 — Panama
M. singaporensis Kulczyński, 1908 — Singapore
M. spatulatus Dong, Yan, Zhu & Song, 2004 — China
M. sutherlandi Tikader, 1971 — India
M. thwaitesi O. Pickard-Cambridge, 1870 — India, Sri Lanka
M. tonatus Chickering, 1968 — Jamaica
M. trailli O. Pickard-Cambridge, 1882 — Brazil
M. uludusun Logunov, 2018 — Malaysia (Borneo)
M. unguliformis Dong, Yan, Zhu & Song, 2004 — China
M. unipus Chickering, 1968 — Panama
M. viridiventris Strand, 1911 — Indonesia (Kei Is.)

References 

Uloboridae
Araneomorphae genera
Cosmopolitan spiders